Arne Knudsen (24 May 1923 – 19 February 2010) was a Norwegian gymnast. He represented the club Drammens TF and competed at the 1952 Summer Olympics.

References

1923 births
2010 deaths
Sportspeople from Drammen
Norwegian male artistic gymnasts
Olympic gymnasts of Norway
gymnasts at the 1952 Summer Olympics
20th-century Norwegian people